Bogdan Leonte may refer to:
 Bogdan-Victor Leonte, a Romanian tennis player
 Bogdan Leonte (rugby union), Romanian-born French rugby union player, playing for CS Bourgoin-Jallieu